Dimitar Zhelyazkov is a Bulgarian criminal from Nessebur, known as Mityo Ochite (The Eyes). He was arrested with sixteen of his associates in 2007, on charges of taking part in an organized drug smuggling and weapons smuggling ring. He was sentenced to four and a half years in prison after years of suspicion about his involvement in the distribution of drugs, smuggling, and racketeering.

History as a criminal

In 2001 his wife and brother were killed following the explosion of a car bomb outside their home in Nessebur. Investigators contend that the bomb was meant to punish Zhelyazkov for his crimes.

In 2005 he was linked to a bomb explosion which killed a 2-year-old infant. During the height of the 2005 tourist season a bomb went off beneath a luxury SUV which was owned by Rali Penkov, a former policeman, in the resort town of Obzor.

In February 2008 Zhelyazkov admitted to being a drug boss, and pleaded guilty to every charge which was brought against him, by the prosecutor in Burgas. He went further in agreeing to cooperate with prosecutors who were conducting other investigations.

Imprisoned

He was sentenced from 4 to 5 years in prison and his property, amounting to $18,000, was confiscated. After a media uproar concerning preferential treatment for a drug lord, Zhelyazkov was sent to Belene Prison, along the Danube River, on the opposite side of Bulgaria from where Burgas is. On 8 June 2009  it was decided by officials at Belene to transfer Zhelyazkov to a low security facility. He was transported to Kazichene Prison near Sofia, Bulgaria. He was returned later to Belene after becoming involved in a fight with another inmate at Kazichene.

References

Bulgarian criminals
People from Burgas Province
Living people
Year of birth missing (living people)
People convicted of drug offenses